Van Cott is a surname. Notable people with the surname include:

Cornelius Van Cott (1838–1904), American politician and baseball executive
George E. Van Cott (1906–1972), American politician
Margaret Newton Van Cott
John Van Cott (1814–1883), American Mormon general authority and missionary